On the Way of Resurrection (Arabic: فِي سَبِيلِ البعث, Fī-Sabīl al-Baʿth) is a political literature book written by Michel Aflaq, one of the founders of Ba'athism. It is a five-volume work that is one of the founding documents of Ba'athism that described the ideology.

References

Ba'athism
Books about nationalism
Books in political philosophy
Political books
Pan-Arabist media